Tetracha camposi is a species of tiger beetle that was described by W. Horn in 1900.

References

Cicindelidae
Beetles described in 1900